The 1861 Vermont gubernatorial election for governor of Vermont was held on Tuesday, September 3. In keeping with the "Mountain Rule", incumbent Republican Erastus Fairbanks, who had also served as governor from 1852 to 1853, was not a candidate for a third one-year term. The Republican nominee was Frederick Holbrook, a former member of the Vermont Senate. With the Democratic Party split nationally over the issue of slavery during the American Civil War, Andrew Tracy, a former member of the United States House of Representatives, appeared on the ballot as a pro-Union Democrat. Benjamin H. Smalley was on the ballot as a "Peace Democrat," Democrats who favored a compromise with the states that had formed the Confederacy.

Vermont continued to oppose slavery and support the Union, which was reflected in its support of Republican candidates. Holbrook easily defeated both Democrats and won a one-year term that began on October 15. Illness confined Holbrook at home for most of October, and he delayed traveling to Montpelier to take his oath of office until October 22.

General election

Results

References 

1861
Vermont
Gubernatorial
October 1861 events